The Parcel 15 Tower is a proposed high-rise building on Boylston Street in Boston's Back Bay. The building would be between Scotia and Dalton streets, approximately 2 blocks from Massachusetts avenue.

The building is proposed to be a mixture of hotel rooms, residential units, and retail space.

References

Back Bay, Boston
Proposed buildings and structures in Massachusetts
Skyscrapers in Boston